Against DRM 2.0 is a free copyleft license for artworks. It is the first free content license that contains a clause about related rights and a clause against digital rights management (DRM).

The first clause authorizes the licensee to exercise related rights, while the second clause prevents the use of DRM. If the licensor uses DRM, the license is not applicable to the work; if the licensee uses DRM, license is automatically void.

External links
 Against DRM license version 2.0 on Internet Archive, archived on March 27th, 2017
 Free Creations website on Internet Archive, archived on March 27th, 2017
 The Readers' Bill of Rights for Digital Books

Digital rights management
Free content licenses
Business of visual arts